The Mövenpick Dead Sea Spa and Resort is a luxury resort hotel on the shore of the Dead Sea, the lowest location on Earth. It was opened in 1999 by Zara Investment Holding, Jordan's largest operator of five-star hotels. Condé Nast has classified it as the best resort in Jordan and one of the best in the Middle East for several years.

The resort is one of the largest in the Middle East. It is known for providing premium therapeutic services using the natural products of the Dead Sea, which are believed to have curative properties. It has 346 rooms and many other amenities, including swimming pools, a fitness centre, a children's club, nine restaurants, and a spa. The hotel, Green Globe certified since 2014, is one of the first in the region to utilize environmentally-friendly solar heating systems.

See also
 Zara Investment Holding
 Tourism in Jordan

References

Hotels in Jordan
Tourism in Jordan
Dead Sea
Hotels established in 1999
Hotel buildings completed in 1999
1999 establishments in Jordan